The Centennial Range is a sub-range of the Saint Elias Mountains.  It is located inside Kluane National Park and Reserve in the far west of Yukon Territory in Canada. It consists of fourteen major peaks, and was named for Canada's Centennial in 1967.   Its peaks bear the names of Canada's provinces and territories, with the exception of Nunavut, which was not a territory at the time. The tallest point is Centennial Peak.  Nine of the peaks were climbed as part of the Yukon Alpine Centennial Expedition, part of the 1967 celebrations.

Geography

The Saint Elias Mountains are the highest in Canada, and second in North America only to the adjacent Alaska Range. They are located at the intersection of the Alaska, Yukon Territory, and British Columbia borders. The Centennial Range is north of Mount Logan and to the west of Mount Lucania. The range lies within Kluane National Park and Reserve.

The range runs roughly east to west, and is bounded by the Walsh Glacier to the south, and the Chitina Glacier to the north. The peaks are named for Canada's provinces and territories (with the exceptions of Centennial Peak and Mount Baffin, named after Baffin Island), and loosely correspond geographically to the positions of their namesakes. Mount Northwest is the farthest west, while Mount Nova Scotia is the easternmost peak. Nunavut does not have a mountain due to it not being a territory in 1967, when the peaks were named.

Yukon Alpine Centennial Expedition
The Alpine Club of Canada (ACC) had been interested in exploration of the more remote areas of the Saint Elias range since 1963.  The club wanted to plan an expedition commemorating the one-hundred year anniversary of the founding of Canada, as well as a joint venture with the American Alpine Club to commemorate the centennial of the Alaska Purchase. The ACC president started discussions with the federal Centennial Commission in 1965 about a mountaineering event as a component of Canada's centennial celebrations.  Federal funding was approved for the expedition in 1966.

Teams were assembled to represent each province and territory.  The proposal called for each team to be made up of residents of the respective area, but due to a shortage of applications, a disproportionate number of climbers came from the mountainous province of British Columbia.  The Centennial expedition was scheduled over two weeks in late July 1967.

Three base camps were established, called T-Bone, Prairie (named for the Canadian Prairies), and Fundy (named for the Bay of Fundy).  Climbers from T-Bone attempted Mount Northwest, Mount Yukon, and Mount British Columbia.  The Prairie camp supported teams on Mount Alberta, Mount Saskatchewan, Mount Ontario, and Mount Manitoba, as well as Centennial Peak.  The Quebec, Prince Edward Island, Newfoundland, and Nova Scotia teams used the Fundy base camp.  In all, nine of the expeditions were successful, despite the fact that the climbers were assessing new routes and fighting windy, wet weather.  Mount Saskatchewan remains unclimbed.

Major peaks
Peaks are listed by their position west to east. Heights from Fisher. 

Mount Northwest, 
Mount Yukon, 
Mount British Columbia, 
Mount Baffin, 
Mount Alberta, 
Mount Saskatchewan, 
Mount Manitoba, 

Centennial Peak, 
Mount Ontario, 
Mount Quebec, 
Mount Prince Edward Island, 
Mount New Brunswick, 
Mount Newfoundland, 
Mount Nova Scotia,

References

External links
"A Photographic Essay about the climb", Stan Rosenbaum on Centennial Peak, 1967

Mountain ranges of Yukon
+
Canadian Centennial
1967 in Canada
Kluane National Park and Reserve